Philodromus rufus vibrans is a subspecies of spider that ambushes its prey and lives in United States and Canada. It is commonly seen in forests, aspen parkland, wetland, riparian zones, and grassland.

References

External links 
The Nearctic Spider Database

rufus vibrans
Spiders of North America
Spiders described in 1964